The Invisible is a 2007 teen supernatural thriller starring Justin Chatwin, Margarita Levieva, Chris Marquette, Marcia Gay Harden, and Callum Keith Rennie. The film, directed by David S. Goyer, was released in theaters on April 27, 2007. The Invisible is a remake of the Swedish film of the same name, which was based on the Swedish young adult novel by Mats Wahl. It is the last movie produced by Hollywood Pictures.

Plot 
High school senior Nick Powell plans to skip his graduation and fly to London for a writing program, despite the plan of his controlling mother, Diane.  His mother pressures him to succeed and is emotionally distant.

Nick's best friend, Pete Egan, confides in him that he is bullied by Annie Newton, a troubled teen. Nick attempts to step in on one such occasion, only for it to escalate into a physical confrontation. Annie's closest friends are violent thieves, and her boyfriend, Marcus, is on parole for similar violations.

Nick tells Pete about his plans to leave for London and they say goodbye. Annie decides to rob a jewelry store across the street from where Marcus is stealing a car. Marcus reprimands her, and tries to take the jewels for himself, but Annie keeps them and pushes him to try to stop her. Believing Annie is out of control, Marcus tips off the cops. Annie is arrested and assumes that Pete is responsible because he saw her load the merchandise into her locker.

She later attempts to beat a confession out of Pete. When Annie does not believe his innocence, Pete reluctantly gives up Nick's name, thinking that Nick is already on a plane to London. He is unaware that Nick gave his ticket to a girl at a party, having decided not to go. When Annie and her crew find Nick walking home from the party, they run him off the road and beat him mercilessly. When Annie believes she has killed Nick, they dump his body into a sewer.

The next morning Nick goes to school to find that no one can see or hear him.  He returns home to find his mother has filed a missing person's report, and the police are investigating his disappearance. After a while, Nick realizes that he is still alive, but unconscious. When Nick realizes that he is having an out-of-body experience, he reaches out to Annie and Pete to save his life.

Corrupt police Detective Larson seems close to putting together the whole truth, and implies that once he finds Annie he will be able to pin the robberies and murder on Marcus. Since Marcus is still on parole, Detective Larson tells him that even being associated with the murder could send him back to prison. Marcus decides to get involved and kidnaps Pete, forcing him to lead him to Nick's body so they can move it to another location. He conspires to kill Annie and arranges to meet with her. Annie calls Pete to the meeting place as well, who is under surveillance by the police. Distraught, Pete pens a suicide note and takes an overdose of pills to commit suicide as Nick frantically watches, begging him not to do it. Before Pete can fully die and starts to leave his body, Nick confronts him since they can see one another. Pete desperately tries to apologize as police close in. As Annie flees from both Marcus and the police, Nick yells at her and she hears him for the first time.

Although the two cannot have a conversation, she hears some of his voice in her head and can sense his presence. Annie feels her actions weighing on her conscience and stops to visit Nick's room to get a sense of who he is. The two realize that they were similar and, given different circumstances, the two could have been close. Diane catches Annie in his room, and she flees. She returns to the woods to find Nick's body, only to see that it has been moved. She confronts Pete and Marcus to learn the body's location. Marcus tells her, but shoots her in the stomach as she leaves. She shoots Marcus in return, and calls the police to tell them where to find Nick. Nick's body is found in a dam and is saved. After visiting him in the hospital, Annie dies from her wounds.

After leaving the hospital, Nick meets Annie's younger brother, Victor, flying his model plane at the park. They both commemorate Annie by writing her a message on top of the plane and flying it across the river bank.

Cast 
 Justin Chatwin as Nicholas "Nick" Powell — The protagonist, who wakes up to find that he is invisible, before discovering that he has been beaten to near death and is projecting himself from his missing body.  In the book, he is called Hilmer Eriksson.
 Margarita Levieva as Annelie "Annie" Newton — A bully who beats Nick to near death, but later regrets her actions.  In the book, she is called Anneli Turgren.
 Marcia Gay Harden as Diane Powell
 Chris Marquette as Pete Egan — Nick's best friend. In the book, he is called Pete Geller. 
 Alex O'Loughlin as Marcus Bohem — Annie's boyfriend, a criminal.  In the book, he is called Marcus Lundkvist.
 Callum Keith Rennie as Detective Brian Larson — The detective investigating Nick's death. In the book, he is called Detective Harold Fors. 
 Michelle Harrison as Detective Kate Tunney — A detective assisting Larson. In the book, she is called Detective Carin Lindblom. 
 Tania Saulnier as Suzie
 Ryan Kennedy as Matty
 Andrew Francis as Dean
 Maggie Ma as Danielle
 P. Lynn Johnson as Sharon Egan
 Serge Houde as Martin Egan
 Bilal Sayed as Dino Garcia
 Cory Monteith as Jimmy

Production 
On August 26, 2005, it was announced that Justin Chatwin is in final  negotiations to play the lead role in the film opposite Margarita Levieva. On October 10, 2005, Marcia Gay Harden joined the cast alongside Chris Marquette.

Filming took place in Vancouver, British Columbia, Canada, beginning in September 2005.

Soundtrack 

The Invisible: Original Soundtrack is a compilation album, the soundtrack to the film The Invisible.

Track listing
 "Taking Back Control" – Sparta
 "Wolf Like Me" – TV on the Radio
 "Open Your Eyes" – Snow Patrol
 "You're All I Have" – Snow Patrol
 "Stars & Sons" – Broken Social Scene
 "Fashionably Uninvited" – Mellowdrone
 "02-20 Boy" – Suicide Sports Club
 "Caterwaul" – And You Will Know Us By the Trail of Dead
 "Under Pressure" – Kill Hannah
 "Body Urge" – The Great Fiction
 "Bliss" – Syntax
 "The Kill" – Thirty Seconds to Mars
 "Perfect Memory" – Remy Zero
 "Music for a Nurse" – Oceansize
 "I Will Follow You Into the Dark" – Death Cab for Cutie

The soundtrack released by Hollywood Records does not contain Marco Beltrami's original score but does include Thirty Seconds to Mars's song "The Kill", the video of which also appears on the DVD.

Release 
The Invisible was released in the US by Disney under the Hollywood Pictures brand on April 27, 2007, making it the last film distributed by Hollywood Pictures before the label was once again dissolved, this time permanently by Disney due to poor box office results.

Home media 
The film was released on Blu-ray Disc and standard DVD on October 16, 2007, by Hollywood Pictures Home Entertainment. The home release includes audio commentary by director David S. Goyer and writers Christine Roum and Mick Davis, as well as deleted scenes and two music videos.

Reception

Box office 
It grossed $7.7 million in its opening weekend across 2019 theaters, and had a total box office of $20.6 million in North America. It grossed another $6.2 million internationally, for a total of $26.8 worldwide.

Critical reception 
The Invisible received negative reviews despite not being screened for critics. Rotten Tomatoes, a review aggregator, reports that 20% of 59 surveyed critics gave the film a positive review; the average rating is 4.1/10.  The consensus reads: "Dull and confusing execution makes this ghost story utterly forgettable and unintentionally funny."  Metacritic rated it 36/100 based on 15 reviews.  Peter Debruge of Variety wrote that it "plays like a very special episode of The O.C." Audiences polled by CinemaScore gave the film an average score of "B" on an A+ to F scale.

References

External links 
 
 
 
 
 

2007 films
2000s thriller films
American teen films
American supernatural thriller films
American remakes of Swedish films
Swedish thriller films
English-language Swedish films
Films shot in Vancouver
Ghost films
Spyglass Entertainment films
Hollywood Pictures films
Films directed by David S. Goyer
Films scored by Marco Beltrami
Films produced by Roger Birnbaum
2000s English-language films
2000s American films
2000s Swedish films